Pirelli Hangar Bicocca is a site for contemporary art exhibitions, located in the Bicocca district of Milan, Italy. The building used to be a Pirelli factory. It was converted into 10,900 square metres of exhibition galleries in 2012.

Since its inception, Pirelli HangarBicocca has hosted exhibitions of artists such as Marina Abramović, Carsten Höller, Alfredo Jaar, Joan Jonas, Mike Kelley, Matt Mullican, Philippe Parreno, Laure Prouvost, Apichatpong Weerasethakul, Maurizio Cattelan,  and Lucio Fontana. It is also the site of a permanent installation by Anselm Kiefer.

History 
HangarBicocca, set up in 2004, officially became a foundation in 2008 after a process of restoration of the former factory premises. Its external appearance recalls what was once its main function, i.e. the headquarters of one of the most important companies in Lombardy's engineering sector: the Ansaldo Group, founded in 1886 by engineer Ernesto Breda from Padua, who contributed to the development of the railway network in Northern Italy through the production of railway carriages, steam and electric locomotives.

Architecture 
On the outside, the building has retained the industrial character of the company to which it belonged. The original rough concrete floors and high ceilings typical of the industrial style of the time have been preserved: in the room containing Anselm Kiefer's permanent installation The Seven Heavenly Palaces, traces of the rails used to test locomotives are still visible. This enormous exhibition space covering almost 15,000 square metres is divided into three main areas: the Cube, the Shed and the Navate.

In order of access to the exhibition spaces, the three main covers are described below.

The Shed 
While maintaining the original inductive character of the typical industrial building of the 1920s, made of exposed brick, low height, with double-pitched roofs and large skylights, components for locomotives and agricultural machinery were produced here.

The Navate 

This is the biggest area of the foundation and it is 30-meter-high building that permanently accommodates the sculptural installation The Seven Heavenly Palaces by Anselm Kiefer.

The Cube 
The cube is a barrel-vaulted cubic body characterised by the fact that, as opposed to the other exhibition spaces in the complex, it enjoys natural lighting as it was used to test electric turbines.

Installations

Permanent installations 

 Anselm Kiefer, The Seven Heavenly Palaces, 2004
 Fausto Melotti, La Sequenza, 1981

Temporary installations 

 OSGEMEOS, Efêmero, current
 Trisha Baga, the eye, the eye and the ear, current
 Chen Zhen, short-circuits, current
 Cerith Wyn Evans, “....the Illuminating Gas”, 2020
 Daniel Steegmann Mangrané, A Leaf-Shaped Animal Draws The Hand, 2020
 Sheela Gowda, Remains, 2019
 Giorgio Andreotta Calò, CittàdiMilano, 2019
 Mario Merz, Igloos, 2019
 Leonor Antunes, The last days in Galliate, 2019
 Matt Mullican, The Feeling of Things, 2018
 Eva Kot’átková, The Dream Machine is Asleep, 2018
 Vari artisti, Take me (I'm Yours), 2018
 Lucio Fontana, Environments, 2018
 Rosa Barba, From Source to Poem to Rhythm to Reader, 2017
 Miroslaw Balka, Crossover/s, 2017
 Laure Prouvost, GDM – Grand Dad’s Visitor Center, 2017
 Kishio Suga, Situations, 2017
 Carsten Höller, Doubt, 2016
 Several artists, Architecture as Art, 2016 (on the occasion of the XXI Triennale Esposizione Internazionale Milano 2016)
 Petrit Halilaj, Space Shuttle in the Garden, 2016
 Philippe Parreno, Hypothesis, 2016
 Damian Ortega, Casino, 2015
 Juan Muñoz, Double Bind & Around, 2015
 Céline Condorelli, Bau Bau, 2015
 Joan Jonas, Light Time Tales, 2015
 João Maria Gusmão & Pedro Paiva, Papagaio, 2014
 Cildo Meireles, Cildo Meireles. Installations, 2014
 Micol Assaël, ILIOKATAKINIOMUMASTILOPSARODIMAKOPIOTITA, 2014
 Dieter Roth Björn Roth, Islands, 2014
 Ragnar Kjartansson, The Visitors, 2014
 Mike Kelley, Eternity is a Long Time, 2013
 Apichatpong Weerasethakul, Primitive, 2013
 Tomás Saraceno, On Space Time Foam, 2013
 Carsten Nicolai, Unidisplay, 2013
 Emilia and Illja Kabakov, The Happiest Man, 2012
 Wilfredo Prieto, Equilibrando la curva, 2012
 Hans-Peter Feldmann, Shadow Play, 2012
 Yervant Gianikian and Angela Ricci Lucchi, NON NON NON, 2012
 Céleste Boursier-Mougenot, From here to ear, 2011
 Surasi Kusolwong, Ping—Pong, Panda, Povera, Pop—Punk, Planet, Politics and P—Art, 2011
 Several artists, Terre vulnerabili 4/4, 2011
 Several artists, Terre vulnerabili 3/4, 2011
 Several artists, Terre vulnerabili 2/4, 2011
 Several artists, Terre vulnerabili 1/4, 2011
 Phill Niblock, The movement of people working, 2010
 Christian Boltanski, Personnes, 2010
 Carlos Casas, End, 2010
 Several artists, Fuori Centro, 2010
 Anthony McCall, Breath: the vertical works, 2009
 Alfredo Jaar, It is difficult, 2009
 BLU, the graffiti on the Hangar walls, 2008
 Lucy and Jorge Orta, Antarctica, 2008
 Daniele Puppi, Fatica n.16, 2008
 Contemporary artists from India, Urban Manners, 2008
 Emergenze project's several artists, Not afraid of the dark, 2007
 Several artists, Collateral, 2007
 Several artists in collaboration with START Association, Start@Hangar, 2007
 Marina Abramović, Balkan Epic, 2006
 Adelina von Fürstenberg, Playground & Toys, 2005
 Mark Wallinger, Easter, 2005

References

External links

 Official Pirelli HangarBicocca website

Contemporary art exhibitions
Museums in Lombardy
Art museums and galleries in Milan
Contemporary art galleries in Italy